Rivière-Rouge Ecological Reserve is an ecological reserve in Quebec, Canada. It was established on November 19, 1997.

References

External links
 Official website from Government of Québec

Protected areas of Laurentides
Nature reserves in Quebec
Protected areas established in 1997
1997 establishments in Quebec